Arthur Saunders Rich (28 June 1807 – 4 September 1865) was an English cricketer who played first-class cricket from 1833 to 1838.  A left-handed batsman, he made six known appearances in first-class matches.  He represented the South in the North v. South series.

References

1807 births
1865 deaths
English cricketers
English cricketers of 1826 to 1863
North v South cricketers
Left-Handed v Right-Handed cricketers
Non-international England cricketers
Fellows of the American Physical Society